Clementius Herman Maria "Clement" Spapen (born 22 November 1906) was a Belgian wrestler. He was Olympic silver medalist in Freestyle wrestling in 1928. He was born in Antwerp.

References

External links
 

1906 births
Date of death unknown
Olympic wrestlers of Belgium
Wrestlers at the 1928 Summer Olympics
Belgian male sport wrestlers
Olympic silver medalists for Belgium
Olympic medalists in wrestling
Medalists at the 1928 Summer Olympics
20th-century Belgian people